Airon-Notre-Dame is a commune in the Pas-de-Calais department in northern France.

Geography
A small village situated about 20 miles (32 km) south of Boulogne-sur-Mer, on the D143E1 road

Population

See also
Communes of the Pas-de-Calais department

References

Communes of Pas-de-Calais